John MacIntosh Lyle (13 November 1872 – 20 December 1945) was an Irish-Canadian architect, designer, urban planner, and teacher active in the late 19th century and into the first half of the 20th century. He was a leading Canadian architect in the Beaux Arts style and was involved in the City Beautiful movement in several Canadian cities. In the 1920s, he worked to develop his vision of a uniquely Canadian style of architecture.

Biography 

Lyle was born in Connor, County Antrim, Ireland on 13 November 1872. He came to Canada as a young child in 1878 and grew up in Hamilton, Ontario, where his father, Rev. Dr. Samuel Lyle, was minister of Central Presbyterian Church. Lyle attended the Hamilton School of Art. He trained as an architect at Yale University, enrolling in the École des Beaux-Arts, in Paris, France, in 1894. Following his graduation, he found work in 1896 with the New York architectural partnership of Howard & Cauldwell. Lyle subsequently became an associate with the New York firm of Carrère and Hastings—with which he was involved in the design of the New York Public Library Main Branch (Fifth Avenue at 42nd St., 1897)—and became a member of the Society of Beaux-arts Architects.

In 1904, John Lyle designed and supervised the construction of the main building (now named Rogers House) at Pickering College at 16945 Bayview Avenue in Newmarket, Ontario.

Lyle returned to Canada in 1905 to begin work on the Royal Alexandra Theatre in Toronto, Ontario. In 1906, he established his own company, Atelier Lyle, in Toronto.

During the 1920s, Lyle strove to develop a uniquely Canadian architectural style, incorporating traditional designs from the English and French colonial periods and stone, metal, plaster, fresco, glass and mosaic floral and faunal motifs inspired by the Canadian post-impressionist painters known as the Group of Seven.

In 1926, the Ontario Association of Architects awarded Lyle its Gold Medal of Honour for his design of the Thornton-Smith Building (1922) on Yonge Street in Toronto. Two years later, he was elected a Fellow of the Royal Institute of British Architects. From 1941 to 1944, he served as president of the Art Gallery of Ontario.

Most of Lyle's projects were in Toronto and other parts of Ontario (and mostly for banks, especially Dominion Bank), but completed projects in New Brunswick, Alberta, Nova Scotia. He submitted proposals for competition for two buildings in United States (1 in Providence, RI and another Chicago), but he did not win either one.

John M. Lyle died in Toronto on 20 December 1945.

Lyle's best-known contribution is Royal Alexandra Theatre, completed in 1907 in the Beaux-Arts style. It was renovated in 1963 and remains one of the city's valued arts venues.

Lyle designed the granite and Indiana limestone Memorial Arch at the Royal Military College of Canada, whose two large bronze tablets bear the names of the ex-cadets who gave their lives for their country in World War I. The stone was laid by Governor-General of Canada, Viscount Byng, of Vimy, CGB KCMG MVO 25 June 1923; Nominal rolls of Cadets and Staff, pamphlets concerning the Arch, the RMCC Review of May 1923, Canadian coins and stamps and the Roll of Honour of the College are in a sealed copper box.

Works

References 

 Martin Eli Weil Award essay: Beaux-Arts on the Banks of Lake Ontario: John M. Lyle and the Royal Military College of Canada's Memorial Arch. Dec. 1994 (19:4), p. 88-99.

External links 

 Biographical Dictionary of Architects in Canada 1800–1950
 Historic Places in Canada
 John M. Lyle fonds, Archives of Ontario

1872 births
1945 deaths
Canadian architects
Artists from Hamilton, Ontario
People from County Antrim
Beaux-Arts architecture in Canada
Canadian alumni of the École des Beaux-Arts